Heaslip may refet to

Places
Heaslip, Ontario, a settlement in Evanturel township

Patronyme
Denis Heaslip (1933–2020), Irish hurler
Fannie Heaslip Lea (1884–1955), American author and poet
Jacko Heaslip (1899–1966), Irish cricket player
James Heaslip (1900–1988), Australian politician
Jamie Heaslip (born in 1983), Irish rugby player
Mark Heaslip (born in 1951), American ice hockey player
Richard Heaslip (born in 1932), British Royal Navy officer
Tanya Heaslip, Australian author
Violet Heaslip, a character in the PBS Kids show WordGirl